Allium herderianum is a plant species native to Gansu and Qinghai in China. It  grows in dry, sunlit locales at elevations of 2900–3900 meters.

Allium herderianum produces on egg-shaped bulb up to 15 mm across. Scape is up to 40 cm tall, round in cross-section. Umbels are crowded with many yellow flowers.

References

herderianum
Onions
Flora of China
Flora of Sichuan
Plants described in 1887